Mohd Azizan bin Baba (9 September 1981 – 22 March 2022) was a Malaysian football player and coach.

Career
Azizan played for Sarawak from 2012 until 2013. After that, he joined Malaysia Premier League side, Penang FA for the 2014 season, appointed  captain until end of season. He also played for Perak, Johor, Kuala Lumpur and Malacca.

Personal life
Azizan was a Malay with Baba-Nyonya descendant, the Chinese peranakan that stayed so long in Malacca for hundred years. He died on 22 March 2022, at the age of 40 due to cancer.

Honours
Perak
 Liga Perdana 1: 2003

Sarawak
 Malaysia Premier League: 2013

Melaka United
 Malaysia FAM League: 2015

References

External links
 

1981 births
2022 deaths
People from Perak
Malaysian people of Chinese descent
Malaysian people of Malay descent
Peranakan people in Malaysia
Malaysian Muslims
Malaysian footballers
Association football midfielders
Melaka United F.C. players